Andreaea regularis is a species of moss that grows in Antarctica and on the South Shetland Islands.

References

Andreaeaceae
Flora of Antarctica